Christopher H. Long (born June 6, 1968) is a college basketball coach. He graduated from the University of Southern Mississippi in 1991 with a degree in advertising and from Alcorn State University in 1997 with a master's degree in school administration. Long served as the head girls' basketball coach at Vicksburg High School from 1997 to 1999 while compiling a 46–19 record. He then became a women's basketball assistant coach under Leon Barmore and Kurt Budke at Louisiana Tech University. Long was named head coach of the Lady Techsters in 2005 and served in that position until he was fired during the 2008–09 season. He then took a men's basketball assistant coaching position under Mike Davis at UAB. In 2010, he got back to women's college basketball at Clemson University to serve as an assistant for Itoro Coleman.

Head coaching record

References

1968 births
Living people
Alcorn State University alumni
American men's basketball coaches
American women's basketball coaches
Clemson Tigers women's basketball coaches
High school basketball coaches in the United States
Louisiana Tech Lady Techsters basketball coaches
UAB Blazers men's basketball coaches
University of Southern Mississippi alumni